Robert Teasdale was a baseball player at the 1956 Summer Olympics.

References 

Baseball players at the 1956 Summer Olympics